Good Times was a popular 1920 Broadway musical extravaganza, with music by Raymond Hubbell and a book by R. H. Burnside.  Produced by Charles Dillingham, it debuted on August 9, 1920 at the Hippodrome in New York City and ran for 456 performances, the longest run for the 1920–21 season.  It was sixth of Dillingham's elaborate spectacles at the Hippodrome.

The popular songs of the "musical spectacle" were The Valley of Dreams, Colorland, and The Wedding of the Dancing Doll. Featuring among the large cast were Abdullah's Arabian troupe, Nanette Flack, The Poodles Hanneford Family (trick horsemen), Joe Jackson, Joseph Parsons and Belle Story.  The famed clown Marceline, a prior fixture at the Hippodrome, also returned for the show.

A representative blurb on the show in a theatre listing from 1921 stated: "Well, there are elephants, and diving girls, and Joe Jackson – and everything."  A rave review in The New York Clipper stated that "the show ... is positively the greatest and most worth-while one of its kind this country has ever seen. ... In pretentiousness it has no equal. Its three acts and fifteen scenes are punched through with riotous color, scenic effects, some of which positively awe the beholder, and rollicking entertainment that has for its motif a horde of capable and versatile entertainers."

A young Cary Grant, just arrived from England, made his American stage debut as a stilt-walker in this production.

Principal cast
As listed in Burns Mantle's Best Plays of 1920–21:
 Belle Story (some sources credit her as Belle Storey)
 "Happy" Jack Lambert
 Arthur Geary
 Joe Jackson
 Ferry Corwey
 Mlle. Natalie
 Emma, Louise, Bertha, and Elsie Rose (The Four Roses)
 Nanette Flack
 The Mannefords
 Joseph Parsons
 Robert MacClellan
 Daisy Smythe
 Elizabeth Coyle
 Virginia Futrelle
 The Pender Troupe
 Berlo Sisters

Musical numbers
As described in the New York Clipper:
 Act 1
(Down in the) Valley of Dreams – Joseph Parsons
Sunbeams – Alice and Edna Nash
Morning and Night – Sascha Piatov and Mlle. Natalie
Youth and Truth – Belle Story and Nannette Flack
Wake Up Father Time – William Williams
The Land I Love – Story and Arthur Geary with Chorus

Act 2 	
The Wedding of the Dancing Doll – Story with Chorus
You Can't Beat the Luck of the Irish – Arthur Geary and Chorus
Dance: Harlequin and Columbine – Sascha Piatov and Mlle. Natalie
Hands Up – "Happy" Lambert
(You're) Just Like a Rose – Flack and Parsons
Hello Imagination – Lambert and Chorus
I Want to Show You Colorland – Story, Geary and Chorus

Act 3 	
Sing a Serenade – Flack
Welcome Truth – Parsons
Truth Reigns Supreme – Story and Chorus

References

External links
 Good Times at Internet Broadway Database

1920 musicals
Broadway musicals